Guanine nucleotide-binding protein-like 3, also known as nucleostemin, is a protein that in humans is encoded by the GNL3 gene. It is found within the nucleolus that binds p53. Nucleostemin regulates the cell cycle and affects cell differentiation, decreasing in amount as this differentiation progresses. It is a marker for many stem cells and cancer cells.

Interactions 
GNL3 has been shown to interact with Mdm2 and P53.

References

Further reading